Andreas Schwab (born 16 November 1952) is an Austrian bobsledder. He competed in the two man and the four man events at the 1976 Winter Olympics.

References

1952 births
Living people
Austrian male bobsledders
Olympic bobsledders of Austria
Bobsledders at the 1976 Winter Olympics
People from Liezen District
Sportspeople from Styria